Keaton Ward (born 4 May 2000) is an English footballer who plays as a midfielder for National League North club Kettering Town

Early life
Ward was born in Mansfield.

Career
After playing youth football for Mansfield Town, and playing for AFC Mansfield on a one-month loan in early 2019, he signed for Barnsley in July 2019 following a trial period at the club. In March 2020, Ward joined FC United of Manchester on a youth loan. In October 2020, he joined Gainsborough Trinity on loan. He made his debut for the club on 24 October 2020 in a 2–1 defeat away to Radcliffe. In December 2020, he joined Ilkeston Town on loan until the end of the season. On 2 February 2021, his contract with Barnsley was terminated by mutual consent.

In March 2021, he returned to Mansfield Town on a contract until the end of the season. He made his first professional appearance on 6 March 2021 as a 79th-minute substitute in a 2–0 defeat away at Barrow. He made 7 appearances for Mansfield Town across the 2020–21 season.

Ward joined National League North club AFC Telford United on a one-month loan deal in January 2022.

Following his release from Mansfield Town Ward joined National League North club Kettering Town.

References

External links

Living people
2000 births
English footballers
Association football defenders
Mansfield Town F.C. players
A.F.C. Mansfield players
Barnsley F.C. players
F.C. United of Manchester players
Gainsborough Trinity F.C. players
Ilkeston Town F.C. players
English Football League players
AFC Telford United players